Lika Yanko (March 19, 1928 – June 22, 2001) was a Bulgarian artist born in Sofia. Her paintings are renowned for their abstract nature and their use of found materials.

Biography 
Lika Yanko was born in Bulgaria's capital, Sofia, in 1928.

She studied at the French College in Sofia, where she was exposed to artists as Paul Cézanne, Vincent van Gogh, Paul Gauguin, who influenced her art.  In 1946 she joined the National Academy of Arts studying painting in the classes of Prof. Dechko Uzunov and Prof. Iliya Petrov, but she did not graduate. At the time, her work was met with criticism and resistances both from state authorities and the aesthetic preferences of her professors and other contemporary painters.

Her paintings are frequently colorful, although the white color is predominant or easily notable because, according to the Lika, this is the color of God.  Her canvases often encapsulate beads, buttons, hemp ropes, nuts, glass, pebbles.

Her first solo exhibition was in Sofia in 1967 but paintings were branded as avant-garde and the show was banned several days after it opened. Yanko continued to paint but did not exhibited her canvases until 1981, when she was invited for an exhibition personally by Lyudmila Zhivkova. In the mid-1970s and later in the 80s her paintings began to be bought by foreign embassies and received the attention of European galleries. In 1989 she received the Sofia Award.

Yanko had only 7 exhibitions during her lifetime. She died on June 22, 2001 in Sofia from pneumonia, only a few days after the opening of her last exhibition, in the Cavallet Gallery in Varna.

References

Content in this edit is translated from the existing Bulgarian Wikipedia article at :bg:Лика Янко; see its history for attribution.

External links
Lika Yanko image on AskArt

1928 births
2001 deaths
20th-century Bulgarian painters
20th-century women artists
Bulgarian people of Albanian descent
People from Sofia